Frederick Styles Agate (29 January 1803 – 1 May 1844) was a noted painter best known for his paintings Ugolino and Old Oaken Bucket.

Life and work
He was born to Thomas Agate and his British wife, Hannah Agate in Sparta, New York in 1803, although some sources give the year as 1807.] Frederick was the brother of another noted painter, Alfred Thomas Agate. At the age of 15, he moved to New York City to study painting under John Rubens Smith.

In 1825, with his friend Thomas S. Cummings, he left Smith to study under Samuel F. B. Morse at the National Academy of Fine Arts in New York City. Agate and Cummings led the movement which resulted in the formation of the National Academy of Design.

Beginning in 1827, he worked as a historical and portrait painter at 152 Broadway in New York City. His work is described as being semi-religious and moralistic. He went to Paris and Florence in 1834–1835, returning home to Sparta, New York, where he died in 1844, aged 41 of undisclosed causes.

References

Sources
Who Was Who in America: Historical Volume, 1607-1896. Chicago: Marquis Who's Who, 1963.
Frederick Styles Agate's biography at AskART

1803 births
1844 deaths
19th-century American painters
American male painters
People from Sparta, New York
Painters from New York City
19th-century American male artists